"Pluto Saves the Ship" is a 51-page black-and-white comic book story scripted by writers Carl Barks, Jack Hannah and Nick George from a plot devised possibly by a publisher, and drawn by Disney animation layout artist Bruce Bushman. It was originally printed in Dell Comics' Large Feature Comics #7 in July 1942, and is one of the first American Disney comics ever made that was not reprinted from newspaper comic strips. It is Barks' first comic book work, and Pluto's first comic book adventure. This was followed in October 1942 by Donald Duck Finds Pirate Gold, the Disney characters' first entry in Dell's Four Color anthology series.

In the story, Pluto foils Nazi saboteurs on a Navy cruiser. Barks said later that "it was only a one-shot special designed to take advantage of the wartime jitters."

Barks wrote the story with Jack Hannah and Nick George, fellow animators at the Disney Studio. The story was partly inspired by two Pluto cartoons that Barks worked on, Bone Trouble (1940) and The Army Mascot (1942).

Barks only produced two stories that took place in the Mickey Mouse universe; the other is "The Riddle of the Red Hat" (Four Color #79, published August 1945).

"Pluto Saves the Ship" has been reprinted in many European countries over the last few decades. The only time it's been reprinted in English was in The Carl Barks Library black and white hardcover collection, in 1988. It has not yet been revealed whether the story will be included in the Fantagraphics Books collection The Complete Carl Barks Disney Library.

See also
List of Disney comics by Carl Barks

References

External links

Pluto Saves the Ship in Carl Barks guidebook

Disney comics stories
1942 in comics
Comics by Carl Barks
Comics about dogs